HD 260655 (also known as GJ 239 or TOI-4599) is a relatively bright and cool M0 V red dwarf star located 33 light-years (10 parsecs) away from the Solar System in the constellation of Gemini. HD 260655 has two confirmed rocky planets, named HD 260655 b and HD 260655 c, that were discovered in 2022. Both planets were detected by the TESS mission and confirmed independently with archival and new precise radial velocity data obtained with the HIRES observatory since 1998, and the CARMENES survey instruments since 2016.

Star 

The star is among the earliest-type M dwarfs in the night sky. Its mass is 0.439 times that of the Sun, and its radius is also 0.439 times that of the Sun. Other designations of HD 260655 include Wolf 287, GJ 239, TOI-4599, HIP 31635 and LHS 1858.

Planetary system 

The orbital period of HD 260655 b is 2.77 days, while HD 260655 c has an orbital period of 5.71 days.

Both planets are ideal candidates for future study of exoplanet atmospheres due to their closeness and their bright red dwarf star. However, as of 2022, there is no evidence that HD 260655 b or HD 260655 c have atmospheres. HD 260655 is also the fourth-closest known system with multiple transiting exoplanets, after HD 219134, LTT 1445, and AU Microscopii.

References 

Gemini (constellation)
M-type main-sequence stars
Planetary systems with two confirmed planets
0239
260655
31635
BD+17 1320
4599